The Caetés (Kaeté) were an indigenous people of Brazil, linguistically belonging to the Tupi people.

Origin of the Caeté People

The Tupi people were a large group of indigenous people who populated Brazil's coast, and they were among the first natives that the Portuguese encountered when they arrived at South America. The Tupi were divided into several tribes such as the: Tupiniquim, Tupinambá, Potiguara, Tabajara, Temiminó, Tamoios, and the Caeté. This tribe was estimated to contain approximately 300-2,000 people in the early 1500s, but their population eventually diminished greatly due to European diseases and slavery once the Portuguese began to settle in Brazil. The many different tribes of the Tupi people, including the Caetés, were constantly at war with each other as the Tupi were not a unified people, despite the fact that they were related linguistically. The Tupi would often attempt to capture their enemies with the intention of using them later in cannibalistic rituals.  The Caeté had a reputation for being particularly violent in their battles, but they were also skilled in agriculture as they grew a variety of crops such as corn, peanuts, tobacco, squash, cotton, and much more.

Enslavement
During the 16th Century, the Caeté tribe inhabited the Brazilian coast from the mouth of the São Francisco River to the island of Itamaracá, by the River Paraíba, in an area limited, in the north, by the land of the potiguaras and, in the south, by tupinambás. With the arrival of the Portuguese, who allied with their enemies, the Tupinambá, the Caetés migrated inland, and some settlements survived in the state of Pará, in Northern Brazil. The arrival of the Portuguese brought many hardships upon the Caetés, as well as the other tribes in the region, as they were now exposed to many of the European illnesses that the Portuguese brought with them, such as smallpox. In addition to being exposed to foreign diseases, the Portuguese began to enslave the indigenous people in large quantity. Those who were not enslaved were either killed or required to assimilate into European culture. Out of the Tupi tribes that were enslaved, the Caeté tribe along with the Tamoio tribe were known to resist in a violent manner.  The enslavement of the Caeté people saw its peak during the 1550s to the 1560s and did not decrease until 1570 when the first law concerning slavery in Brazil was developed. Prior to 1570, Manuel da Nóbrega, who disagreed with the way the Caeté people were being treated, made an effort to pass such a law. As a prominent Jesuit priest, Nóbrega had a great influence throughout the history of Brazil, and one of his goals was to achieve peace between the natives and the colonists. His father, Baltasar da Nóbrega, was a prominent judge of justice in Portugal. Manuel da Nóbrega took after his father by attending the University of Coimbra where he received his baccalaureate is Canon Law and philosophy. In his attempt to develop laws regarding slavery, Manuel da Nóbrega asked King John III of Portugal if he could establish an episcopacy in Brazil and King John III granted his request. During this process, one of Nóbrega's biggest opponents was the first bishop of Brazil (Pedro Fernandes Sardinha), who happened to promote the idea of the "native-hunt". However, after Sardinha was captured and eaten by the Caeté people, and after Nóbrega himself received multiple threats about being killed and eaten, he changed his mind regarding the mission.

Cannibalism
The Caetés, like many other indigenous people in the coast of Brazil, practiced a ritual form of cannibalism. It was a common belief among the Caetés, and the many other tribes included in the Tupi people, that the act of cannibalism and the digestion of an enemy would lead to the absorption of that enemy's strength. As they also believed that weakness could be absorbed from those they consumed, they were cautious to only absorb the essence of enemy warriors that they perceived to be of noticeable strength and courage. The Caeté people considered it an honor, even when captured, to be sacrificed for this ritual as it meant they had fought valiantly in battle and were considered the most superior warriors in their tribe. Cannibalism amongst the Caeté and other various Tupi tribes in the region decreased greatly upon the arrival of the Portuguese in the early 1500s; however, this ritual was not completely absent amongst the culture. For example, there was a report that the Caeté people had eaten one of the first Catholic bishops (Pedro Fernandes Sardinha), to arrive in Brazil in 1556, the Caetés were considered "enemies of the civilized world" and were chased and killed in large numbers by the Portuguese with the added help of the fully armed Tupinambá tribes. During this occurrence, the Caeté took over the ship that Sardinha was on and ate all of the passengers on board with the exception of a few who survived to report this incident. As a result, the Caetés became an even bigger target of Portuguese attacks as they were now considered to be completely savage people.

Literary reputation

The negative reputation of the Caeté people was so strong that the Caeté people even left a mark in the literary world. For example, in an influential epic written by Santa Rita Durão in 1781, the Caeté people were presented as the enemy of Diogo Álverez and Paraguaçu. The Caeté people were also featured in multiple works by the author Nisia Floresta. The poem A Lágrima de um Caheté which was written by Floresta was deemed to be unique due to her use of a Caeté Indian as the main character and hero. Both prior to and after this poem was written, standard Indianist literature selected heroes from peaceable Indian tribes who favored the Portuguese. Since these characteristics are not descriptive of the Caeté tribe, it is suggested that Floresta chose this Caeté man as a hero due to his persistence to continue fighting even while being oppressed. She used this character to show that the Caeté tribe demonstrated great courage while being mistreated meanwhile the Portuguese acted in a cowardly manner. In another work by Floresta, she incorporates a character from the Caeté tribe who is extremely barbaric in nature and expresses a great need to be civilized. These two traits the character possessed were well-known attributes of the Caeté tribe. Floresta uses this character from the Caeté tribe to represent her own desire for Brazil to become civilized at an equal status with Europe. The Caeté people suffered greatly from many oppressors but never went down without a fight. Floresta's poems used the Caeté people in a way most had never seen them and had highlighted their fierceness and independence.

Influence

During the first period of Portuguese settlement in Brazil, the Caeté people unceasingly resisted European efforts to colonize. Once the majority of the population had been exposed to diseases or enslaved, most of the Caeté people died off. Those who did survive though began to assimilate into Portuguese culture. Therefore, race-mixing began when Portuguese settlers began to rape the indigenous women. The Portuguese forced their influence upon the assimilated Caeté people, which led to the disappearance of the natives' traditions, rituals, language, and culture. Although there are remains of Caeté pottery in many parts of inland Brazil, and evidence of their survival in Northern Brazil, they are now extinct.

References

Indigenous peoples in Brazil
Cannibalism in South America
Extinct ethnic groups